Protanilla is a genus of subterranean ants in the subfamily Leptanillinae. Known from the Indomalayan realm, the genus contains about thirteen species. The genus was erected by Taylor (1990) for the type species P. rafflesi, described from workers from Peninsular Malaysia. Species in this genus have long and downcurved mandibles with peg-like tooth on the inner margins. Four species are known from China (P. bicolor, P. concolor, P. gengma and P. tibeta), one from Taiwan (P. lini), one from Sri Lanka (P. schoedli) and a couple from India (P. wardi, P. flamma).

Species
Protanilla beijingensis Man et al., 2017
Protanilla bicolor Xu, 2002
Protanilla concolor Xu, 2002
Protanilla flamma Baidya & Bagchi, 2020
Protanilla furcomandibula Xu & Zhang, 2002
Protanilla gengma Xu, 2012
Protanilla izanagi Terayama, 2013
Protanilla jongi Hsu et al., 2017
Protanilla lini Terayama, 2009
Protanilla rafflesi Taylor, 1990
Protanilla schoedli Baroni Urbani & De Andrade, 2006
Protanilla tibeta Xu, 2012
Protanilla wardi Bharti & Akbar, 2015

References

External links

Leptanillinae
Ant genera
Hymenoptera of Asia